Giblets may refer to:
 Giblets, the edible offal of a fowl
 Gibs, or giblets, gamer slang expression for the remnants of a kill
 Gibelet, a 13th-century Crusader holding, today known as Byblos
 Guelphs and Ghibellines,  Crusader factions